Huang Kaizhou (born 13 May 2002) is a Chinese footballer currently playing as a forward for Guangzhou.

Career statistics

Club
.

References

2002 births
Living people
Chinese footballers
Association football forwards
Guangzhou F.C. players
21st-century Chinese people